FC Goa is an Indian professional football club based in Goa. The club participates in the Indian Super League, the top tier of Indian football. The club was established on 26 August 2014. They play their home matches at the Fatorda Stadium in Margao.

Key
Key to league competitions:

 Indian Super League – Rebranded India's Top Tier Football League, Established In 2014

Key to colours and symbols:

Key to league record:
 Season = The year and article of the season
 Finals = Final position
 P = Games played
 W = Games won
 D = Games drawn
 L = Games lost
 GF = Goals scored
 GA = Goals against
 Pts = Points

Key to cup record:
 En-dash (–) = The FC Goa did not participate or cup not held
 R32 = Round of 32
 R16 = Round of 16
 QF = Quarter-finals
 SF = Semi-finals
 RU = Runners-up
 W = Winners

Seasons
The Goa started to play in the Indian Super League from its inception in 2014. They were one of the eight founding teams of the league. From 2017-18 season onwards, two more teams were added into the league. The Super Cup did not exist for the first three seasons until it was introduced in 2017. In 2020, one more team was added into the league.

See also
 FC Goa
 FC Goa Reserves and Academy
 List of FC Goa players
 List of FC Goa records and statistics

References

External links 

FC Goa seasons
FC Goa
FC Goa
seasons